Mastus is a genus of air-breathing land snails, terrestrial pulmonate gastropod mollusks in the family Enidae.

Species
Species:
Mastus abundans 
Mastus alpicola 
Mastus amenazada 
Mastus anatolicus 
Mastus athensis 
Mastus bielzi 
Mastus butoti 
Mastus carneolus 
Mastus caucasica 
Mastus claudia 
Mastus cretensis 
Mastus dirphicus 
Mastus emarginatus 
Mastus etuberculatus 
Mastus gittenbergeri 
Mastus grandis 
Mastus hemmeni 
Mastus ierapetranus 
Mastus itanosensis 
Mastus oligogyrus 
Mastus olivaceus 
Mastus procax 
Mastus pupa 
Mastus pusio 
Mastus riedeli 
Mastus rossmaessleri 
Mastus sitiensis 
Mastus sphakiotus 
Mastus subaii 
Mastus transsylvanicus 
Mastus unius 
Mastus venerabilis 
Mastus violaceus

References

Further reading
 Parmakelis A., Spanos E., Papagiannakis G., Louis C. & Mylonas M. (2003). "Mitochondrial DNA phylogeny and morphological diversity in the genus Mastus (Beck, 1837): a study in a recent (Holocene) island group (Koufonisi, south-east Crete)". Biological Journal of the Linnean Society 78(3): 383-399.

External links
 Animal Base info

Enidae